Želetice may refer to places in the Czech Republic:

Želetice (Hodonín District), a municipality and village
Želetice (Znojmo District), a municipality and village